Leatherwood may refer to:

Plants 
Cyrilla, a plant genus of tropical to warm temperate Americas
Dirca, a plant genus of temperate North America
Eucryphia lucida, a plant species of Tasmania
Olearia colensoi, a plant endemic to New Zealand

Places 
Leatherwood Plantation, a Virginia plantation once owned by Patrick Henry
 Leatherwood, Indiana
Leatherwood, Kentucky, an area in Perry County, Kentucky
 Leatherwood, Tennessee

Other uses 
Leatherwood (surname)

See also 
 Leatherwood Creek (disambiguation)